Speed Dealer Moms EP is a 2010 record by the electronic band Speed Dealer Moms, consisting of John Frusciante, Aaron Funk and Chris McDonald. It was released on December 6, 2010 on Planet Mu Records.

Track listing

References

2010 EPs
Electronic EPs